Hakushima Station is a HRT station on Astram Line, located in 18–20, Hakushima-kitamachi, Naka-ku, Hiroshima.

Platforms

Connections
█ Astram Line
 — ●Hakushima — ●

Other services connections

Around station
Hiroshima Home TV
Sotoku High School
Sotoku Junior High School
Yasuda Girl's High School
Yasuda Girl's Junior High School
Yasuda Elementary School

History
Opened on August 20, 1994.

See also
Astram Line
Hiroshima Rapid Transit

References

Hakushima Station
Railway stations in Japan opened in 1994